The Obice da 149/19 modello 37 was a heavy howitzer which served with Italy during World War II. It was intended to replace Italy's assortment of World War I-era heavy howitzers, but this was prevented by the prolonged development time and the very slow pace of production. Despite orders totaling 1392 weapons only 147 had been built by September 1942. There were three models, the 37, 41 and 42, differing only in details. The standard tractor was the Trattore SPA TM 40. The Germans kept it in production with the designation of 15 cm sFH 404(i) after the Italian surrender in 1943. With the same weight it had superior range compared to the German 15 cm sFH 18. It was used by the Italian army until 1974.

References 
 Chamberlain, Peter & Gander, Terry. Heavy Artillery. New York: Arco, 1975 
 Gander, Terry and Chamberlain, Peter. Weapons of the Third Reich: An Encyclopedic Survey of All Small Arms, Artillery and Special Weapons of the German Land Forces 1939-1945. New York: Doubleday, 1979 

World War II field artillery
Artillery of Italy
World War II artillery of Italy
150 mm artillery
Gio. Ansaldo & C. artillery
OTO Melara
Military equipment introduced in the 1930s